Dwight Caldwell (1902–1981) was an American film editor. He worked on more than a hundred productions, including several serials, mainly at Majestic Pictures and Columbia Pictures.

Selected filmography

 Sea Devils (1931)
 The Mystery Train (1931)
 Defenders of the Law  (1931)
 Air Eagles (1931)
 Cheating Blondes (1933)
 Night Alarm (1934)
 Shadows of the Orient (1935)
 Motive for Revenge (1935)
 The Perfect Clue (1935)
 Mutiny Ahead (1935)
 Reckless Roads (1935)
 Western Courage (1935)
 The Cattle Thief (1936)
 North of Nome (1936)
 Rio Grande Ranger (1936)
 Heroes of the Range (1936)
 Ranger Courage (1936)
 The Unknown Ranger (1936)
 The Fugitive Sheriff (1936)
 Roaring Timber (1937)
 Under Suspicion (1937)
 Reformatory (1938)
 Phantom Gold (1938)
 Pioneer Trail (1938)
 Hidden Power (1939)
 Frontiers of '49 (1939)
 Fugitive at Large (1939)
 Fugitive from a Prison Camp (1940)
 Passport to Alcatraz (1940)
 The Great Swindle (1941)
 The Crime Doctor's Strangest Case (1943)
 Shadows in the Night (1944)
 The Crime Doctor's Courage (1945)
 Crime Doctor's Warning (1945)
 Voice of the Whistler (1945)
 Just Before Dawn (1946)
 Mysterious Intruder (1946)
 Crime Doctor's Man Hunt (1946)
 The Secret of the Whistler (1946)
 The Crime Doctor's Gamble (1947)
 The Millerson Case (1947)
 The Thirteenth Hour (1947)
 Key Witness (1947)
 The Return of the Whistler (1948)
 Trapped by Boston Blackie (1948)
 Top Gun (1955)
 The Three Outlaws (1956)
 Frontier Gambler (1956)

References

Bibliography
 Michael R. Pitts. Poverty Row Studios, 1929–1940: An Illustrated History of 55 Independent Film Companies, with a Filmography for Each. McFarland & Company, 2005.

External links

1902 births
1981 deaths
American film editors
People from Columbus, Ohio